is a Japanese banana-shaped sponge cake with cream filling.

Tokyo Bananas come in many different flavors and are usually packaged individually in plastic. The original flavor is known as Tokyo Banana , and is filled with a banana custard cream. The cream filling uses strained banana puree. After baking, the sponge cake is steamed to bring out a soft texture.

Tokyo Banana Miitsuketa is manufactured at MASDAC Corporation's factory in Tokorozawa, Saitama. Tokyo Bananas are sold across stores in Tokyo and in several major Japanese airports.

History
Tokyo Banana , the original banana custard flavor, first went on sale in 1991. Even before Tokyo Banana, there were a large number of souvenir cakes in Tokyo, but Tokyo Banana was the first to include "Tokyo" in its product name.

As of 2016, the yearly sales are roughly 4 billion yen.

The first store selling Tokyo Banana outside of Tokyo was established in Osaka by Grapestone in April 2020 as travel slumped during the COVID-19 pandemic. In 2022, a new flagship store dedicated solely to Tokyo Banana products was opened in Tokyo Station.

Tokyo Banana Series 

 Tokyo Banana Miitsuketa
 A banana shaped sweet full of banana custard wrapped in a fluffy sponge. Best consumed within 7 days of purchase, though refrigeration can stretch this a bit.

 Tokyo Banana Miitsuketa caramel flavour
 Caramel banana custard cream wrapped up in a caramel coloured and flavoured sponge. Went on sale on August 10th 2011 celebrating 20 years of sales of Tokyo Banana.

 Tokyo Choco Banana
 Banana cream inside chocolate. It becomes banana mint flavour "Summer Choco" in the summer season (mid May - mid September).

 Tokyo Banana Pie
 Folded up banana flavoured biscuit dough and pastry.

 Fresh Cream Puff
 Cream and banana custard cream puff.

 Tokyo Banana Raisin Sandwich
 Rum-raisin banana ganache sandwiched between banana scented cookies.

 Wagashi Tokyo Banana
 Banana anko in a moist outer layer.

 Moist Baumkuchen
 3 layers of cake mixture layered atop one another and moistly baked baumkuchen

 Tokyo Banana Fresh Moist Baumkuchen 
 Tokyo Banana Baumkuchen Brule
 Tokyo Banana Roll Cake <Choco Banana>
 Tokyo Banana Miitsuketa Gaufrette
 Tokyo Banana Ai to Sachi (new product August 2008)
 Ice Monaka

Products sold in the past

Kuro Bei 
 Tokyo Banana Kuro Bei (jp:黒ベエ)
 Ample banana custard wrapped in a bitter-sweet cocoa sponge cake.

 Chocolate Pie
 Chocolate rolled up in cocoa flavoured pastry folded into 328 layers.

 Moist Baumkuchen
 Consisting of 2 layers of chocolate banana mixture and muscovado mixture.

 Dorayaki
 Japanese dessert consisting of two slices of sponge cake with red bean jam in between
 Black Sesame Seed Pie Kuro Bei
 Kuro Bei Raisin

See also
 List of brand name snack foods

References

External links

 Tokyo Banana World (English)
 Tokyo Banana World (Japanese)

Brand name snack foods
Japanese desserts and sweets